Medicago lupulina, commonly known as black medick, nonesuch, or hop clover, is a plant of dry grassland belonging to the legume or clover family. Plants of the genus Medicago, or bur clovers, are closely related to the true clovers (Trifolium) and sweet clover (Melilotus). Like the true clovers, black medick has three leaflets and a small, yellow flower closely resembling those of lesser trefoil. Black medick belongs to the same genus as alfalfa.

Names
The generic name Medicago is derived, via Latin , from Ancient Greek  "Median", because alfalfa was believed to have been introduced from the region of Media (now in Iran) in antiquity. The specific name lupulina means "wolf-like", and refers to the hop, or willow-wolf. Its scientific name is a translation of the common name hop clover (or hop-clover), which is also used for several members of the genus Trifolium.

Also spelled "medic" or "meddick", the plant is known by a number of alternate names, including nonesuch, black nonesuch, black medic clover, hop clover, hop medic, black clover, black hay, blackweed, English trefoil, hop trefoil, and yellow trefoil. Some of these names are also applied to wildflowers of the related genera Trifolium and Melilotus.

Description
Medicago lupulina is an annual or short-lived perennial plant, growing each year from adventitious buds on the roots. The leaves are compound, each with three oval leaflets, carried on a short petiole; the center leaflet usually has a longer petiole. The leaflets are hairy, toothed toward the tip, and differ from those of the similar Trifolium dubium in that they end in a short point.

Black medick has small (2–3 mm) yellow flowers grouped in tight bunches (compact racemes). On larger plants the flower heads may reach  or more. The fruit is a single-seeded pod, 1.5 to 3 mm in diameter, that does not open upon maturation, but hardens and turns black when ripe. Each pod contains a single amber-colored seed.

Like other legumes, the roots of black medick contain nodules hosting nitrogen-fixing bacteria. Plants that survive for more than one year may develop a deep tap root.

Distribution
A native of the old world, black medick is found throughout Europe, north Africa, the Near East, and most of Asia, including India, China, and Korea. It is naturalized in central Asia, Japan, South Africa, Australia, New Zealand, the United States, Canada, and much of South America. Black medick is found throughout the United States, including Hawaii and Alaska.

Black medick thrives in dry to moist, well-drained soils containing sand, loam, or clay, and is a pioneer plant, often growing on disturbed ground. It grows in alkaline, neutral, and mildly acidic conditions. It does not grow in shady areas. Black medick grows well in limestone soils and on coastal sand dunes, where it suffers less competition from the other plants, and as such is found on many islands, such as Taiwan, the Canary Islands, the Azores, and Madeira. It is resistant to cold and can be found on mountains up to 1,800 meters.

Uses
Black medick is a good source of nectar for bees to use to make honey.  It is frequently found in natural pastures, and may be planted in order to create artificial meadows, especially on dry land. The presence of black medick in large concentrations as a lawn weed may indicate that the soil is poor in nitrogen. However, because black medick and other clovers fix nitrogen in the soil, this deficiency can improve over time due to the presence of these plants.

Black medick is sometimes used as a fodder plant. Its hardiness and ability to grow in poor soils, as well as its tendency to fix nitrogen in the soil, make black medick a good choice for pasturage, although its fodder value is limited. It is grazed by sheep but is not very palatable to cattle.

Similar plants
Black medick may be confused with other plants that have three leaflets and small yellow flowers, such as hop trefoil (Trifolium campestre), large hop trefoil (T. aureum), lesser hop trefoil (T. dubium), and yellow woodsorrel (Oxalis stricta).

Photographs

Illustrations

References

External links
 
 Entry in the Linnean herbarium
 A mention in 1866 from the Correspondence of Charles Darwin: "Several years ago I protected Medicago lupulina from insects, & its fertility was much impaired, but not wholly prevented."
 WeedAlert.com's listing for Medicago lupulina
 Effect of Black Medic Cover Crop on N Supplying Power of Prairie Soils
 Wikispecies entry

lupulina
Flora of Lebanon
Plants described in 1753
Taxa named by Carl Linnaeus
Flora of Lebanon and Syria
Flora of Malta